Tyrosine-protein kinase ABL1 also known as ABL1 is a protein that, in humans, is encoded by the ABL1 gene (previous symbol ABL) located on chromosome 9. c-Abl is sometimes used to refer to the version of the gene found within the mammalian genome, while v-Abl refers to the viral gene, which was initially isolated from the Abelson murine leukemia virus.

Function 

The ABL1 proto-oncogene encodes a cytoplasmic and nuclear protein tyrosine kinase that has been implicated in processes of cell differentiation, cell division, cell adhesion, and stress response such as DNA repair.  Activity of ABL1 protein is negatively regulated by its SH3 domain, and deletion of the SH3 domain turns ABL1 into an oncogene.  The t(9;22) translocation results in the head-to-tail fusion of the BCR and ABL1 genes, leading to a fusion gene present in many cases of chronic myelogenous leukemia. The DNA-binding activity of the ubiquitously expressed ABL1 tyrosine kinase is regulated by CDC2-mediated phosphorylation, suggesting a cell cycle function for ABL1.  The ABL1 gene is expressed as either a 6- or a 7-kb mRNA transcript, with alternatively spliced first exons spliced to the common exons 2–11.

Clinical significance 

Mutations in the ABL1 gene are associated with chronic myelogenous leukemia (CML).  In CML, the gene is activated by being translocated within the BCR (breakpoint cluster region) gene on chromosome 22.  This new fusion gene, BCR-ABL, encodes an unregulated, cytoplasm-targeted tyrosine kinase that allows the cells to proliferate without being regulated by cytokines. This, in turn, allows the cell to become cancerous.

This gene is a partner in a fusion gene with the BCR gene in the Philadelphia chromosome, a characteristic abnormality in chronic myelogenous leukemia (CML) and rarely in some other leukemia forms. The BCR-ABL transcript encodes a tyrosine kinase, which activates mediators of the cell cycle regulation system, leading to a clonal myeloproliferative disorder. The BCR-ABL protein can be inhibited by various small molecules.  One such inhibitor is imatinib mesylate, which occupies the tyrosine kinase domain and inhibits BCR-ABL's influence on the cell cycle. Second generation BCR-ABL tyrosine-kinase inhibitors are also under development
to inhibit BCR-ABL mutants resistant to imatinib.

Interactions 

ABL gene has been shown to interact with:

 ABI1,
 ABI2,
 ABL2,
 ATM,
 BCAR1,
 BCR,
 BRCA1,
 CAT,
 CBL,
 CRKL,
 DOK1,
 EPHB2,
 GPX1,
 GRB10,
 MTOR,
  GRB2,
 MDM2,
 NCK1,
 NEDD9,
 NTRK1, 
 P73,
 PAG1,
 PAK2,
 PSTPIP1,
 RAD9A,
 RAD51,
 RB1,
 RFX1,
 RYBP,
 SHC1,
 SORBS2,
 SPTA1,
 SPTAN1,
 TERF1,
 VAV1, and
 YTHDC1.

Regulation 

There is some evidence that the expression of Abl is regulated by the microRNA miR-203.

See also 
 BCR gene

References

Further reading

External links 
 
  (ABL)
 
 Drosophila Abl tyrosine kinase - The Interactive Fly
 ABL1 Info with links in the Cell Migration Gateway
 ABL1 on the Atlas of Genetics and Oncology
 
 
 

Tyrosine kinases